Matekoraha Te Peehi Jaram (27 February 1902–20 September 1978) was a New Zealand weaver, tailor, and community leader. Of Māori descent, she identified with the Ngāti Awa, Ngāti Maru (Taranaki) and Ngāti Pūkeko iwi. She was born in Whiritoa, Thames/Coromandel, New Zealand on 27 February 1902.

References

1902 births
1978 deaths
New Zealand Māori weavers
Ngāti Awa people
Ngāti Maru (Hauraki)
People from Coromandel Peninsula
Women textile artists